The Rehn–Meidner model is an economic and wage policy model developed in 1951 by two economists at the research department of the Swedish Trade Union Confederation (LO), Gösta Rehn and Rudolf Meidner. The four main goals to be achieved were:
 Low inflation
 Full employment
 High growth
 Income equality

Overview 
The model is based upon an interaction between Keynesian fiscal economics, real wage growth, active labour market policies and state intervention. The purpose was to create a positive spiral as part of the business cycle, in accordance with Keynesian theory, as the creation of an expansive welfare state and public investment meant to maintain domestic demand over economic cycles ensured security, safety and stability to labour, capital, business and consumers. This, in turn, helped to ensure low inflation, by helping to prevent wage-price spirals and thereby strengthened trade unions in demanding rising real wages in line with productivity growth, which, combined with the effects of the welfare state and social programs, led to increased purchasing power and consumer confidence, resulting in rising general demand and an upwards, self-maintaining cycle which led to high growth rates and full employment, fueled by progressive taxation and redistribution of wealth, as that further increased spending power and ensured equality of incomes.

Unprofitable enterprises in the market were to be pushed toward what was known as the solidarity wage policy, with rising wages in line with productivity growth.  Wages falling behind productivity growth creates negative wage compression, while holding wages in line with productivity allows no wage compression or expansion.  This was expected to force firms to improve their productive capacity in order to improve profitability, through measures such as structural adjustment as well as robotisation and automation of production, and through more indirect means such as improved working conditions meant to decrease rates of sick-leave and increase productivity.  Rehn argued for mobility-enhancing labor-market policies, including high unemployment benefits, based on a notion of "security by wings" rather than "security under shells." This aimed to make workers less dependent on a specific job, such that they would find new jobs as structural changes caused by productivity growth reduced the need for workers in existing jobs.  Rehn also recognized that high unemployment benefits may lead to longer job search periods, suggesting this would lead to more efficient labor markets by matching workers with jobs better fitting their skills and abilities; modern research has found evidence of this improved matching effect.

All of this freed labour resources, who were then mobilized in high-productive corporations, by means of active labour market policies, as they benefited from the labour costs comparatively favourable to them and were expanding production as general demand rose when real wages, and thereby purchasing power, increased. This led to soaring profits which were re-invested in improving the productive capacity of those corporations, partly to increase profitability, partly to meet the rising demand, partly because tax incentives favoured long-term investments in e.g. research and development, rather than in capital gains and dividends, and partly in order for these corporations not to become unproductive and thereby risk bankruptcy, ensuring high productivity growth and rising real wages, and thereby full employment and an equal distribution of incomes, whilst inflationary pressures were prevented through an incomes policy of national wage arbitration and central collective bargaining between labour unions, industrial representatives and governments, ensuring real wages did not exceed productivity growth through improving other forms of compensation, such as social benefits, working conditions, working hours and employment security.

Employee Funds 

A proposal was discussed in the LO congress of 1971, the Löntagarfonderna, that called for requiring all companies above a certain size to issue new stock shares to workers in order to redistribute the wealth created by the company, this proposal was based on four measures:
 All companies above 50 employees were to issue each year stock amounting to 20% of the year profits 
 This stock and the profits entitled would belong to the local unions as long as they did not surpass 20% of the company stock
 New stock could not be sold and will be included as an asset of the workers fund 
 The stock dividends will be reinvested in stock of the same company or used for employees training

This part of the model was never fully implemented because of changes in the Swedish government and the frontal opposition of the employers.

Outside Sweden 
The Rehn-Meidner Model was utilized in somewhat different shapes across the Western world and proved successful in achieving its goals as was shown in the prosperous time of the post-war Golden Age of Capitalism. The model was made possible and nations were incentivized to implement it through the Bretton Woods system, which was the name for the postwar international financial order that regulated currencies, exchange rates and capital flows, partly through the use of mutual capital controls, so as to allow nations to finance their welfare states through the use of progressive taxation without fear of speculative attacks, capital flight, tax evasion and deindustrialization.

Decline and legacy 
There was much more to be had from the employee fund and the Rehn-Meidner model. Do the funds complement the wage solidarity policy? Will the funds reduce the concentration of ownership? Will employee funds result in more employees? Will employee funds affect investment and employment? Finally, Are the funds neutral with respect to costs, prices, and pay? These questions are still the subject of further debates on this policy that is considered a form of socialization. Unfortunately, the Rehn-Meidner model was never fully realized as the political climate was changing thanks to the, “economy experiencing stagnation—a product of the OPEC oil shock” (Gowan, 2018). On top of that Rehn-Meidner was controversial to the business community as it was seen as socialism and was seen as a threat to the interests of employers. With the Social democrats losing the election the opposition party had no intention of supporting this plan and viewed it with contempt. Even when the party came back to power the damage had already been done. The Social democrats even abandoned the model as a new economic consensus took hold from the recent perception of failure of the post-war consensus where economic austerity, free trade, and deregulation would be the new norm. While the Rehn-Meidner model never fully came to fruition it had a legacy in still upholding what remains of the old welfare program of Sweden and to this day the party maintains that. What can be taken away from the Rehn-Meidner model is that there are companies that have stock ownership for employees where the workers have ownership over the companies albeit voluntarily rather than through government policies. In Germany, companies are mandated to have labor representation on their boards but not through employee fund. While the Rehn-Meidner was not implemented, Matthews (2019) indicated that in the recent 2020 democrat presidential primary election in the U.S, Bernie Sanders ran on a platform where part of his platform proposed a form of employee ownership styled after Rehn and Meidner’s idea of the employee fund. (Layard, 21) believes that the “right course for Sweden is to stick to the active labour market policy and to continue the fight to achieve consensus over collective wage-bargaining in the interests of the whole society.”

In Sweden, by the mid-1960s, the Swedish Confederation of Trade Unions (LO) moved toward a preference for job security, and successfully lobbied the Swedish government to pass the Job Security Act of 1974.  This effectively shifted Swedish macroeconomic policy from the Rehn-Meidner notion of "security by wings" to "security under shells."  Further economic and political developments, including the oil supply crises of the 1970s and 1980s and increased international competition, pushed Sweden further from the Rehn-Meidner model and drew increasing focus onto pre-Keynesian economic ideas.

Alternative Views
Alexopoulos and Cohen contend that, in opposition to the consensus view, the wage compression would demoralize high skilled workers, reducing their effort and productivity, and thus eroding profits. In their explanation, absenteeism rates soared, investment in human capital tumbled, and labour productivity dropped. While the possible consequences of a high price floor on low skilled workers was counteracted with an inflation bias, via monetary policy, and, in time, growth in the public sector to counter employment effects. As a result of pressures by labor, high productive firms, who initially supported the plan to alleviate their labor shortages, opted to negotiate outside of the frame agreement and, in effect, brought the system to an end allowing further decentralization in bargaining along with widened wage differentials.

See also 

 Nordic Model

References 

Keynesian economics
Labour economics
Economic history of Sweden